Pixley Airport , also known as Harmon Field, was a county-owned public-use airport located in Tulare County, California, United States, one nautical mile (2 km) southwest of the central business district of Pixley, California.

The airport opened in 1949. It was vacated and closed in early 1994 due to pesticide contamination from its years as a base for crop dusting.

Pixley airport's FAA location identifier was Q90 until 2003, when it was changed to P27. It remained in published FAA records until 2008, when it was listed as "public use" and noted as "closed indefinitely".

Facilities and aircraft 
Pixley Airport covered an area of 99 acres (40 ha) at an elevation of 256 feet (78 m) above mean sea level. It has one runway designated 13/31 with an asphalt surface measuring 2,050 by 60 feet (625 x 18 m).

For the 12-month period ending July 20, 1993, the airport had 8,400 general aviation aircraft operations, an average of 23 per day. At that time, there were 7 aircraft based at this airport:
86% single-engine and 14% multi-engine.

References

External links 
 Aerial image as of June 1994 from USGS The National Map

Defunct airports in California
Airports in Tulare County, California